Gastão Elias was the two-time defending champion and successfully defended his title, defeating Alessandro Giannessi 7–6(7–4), 6–1 in the final.

Seeds

Draw

Finals

Top half

Bottom half

References

External links
Main draw
Qualifying draw

Open de Oeiras II - 1